The Surmatash Nature Reserve is located in Kadamjay District of Batken Region of Kyrgyzstan. Its purpose is conservation of unique nature complexes and biological diversity, protection of rare and threatened species of flora and fauna, and extending network of specially protected nature areas.  

It is situated in the Alay Range, around the upper course of the river Isfayramsay and its tributaries Surmatash, Tengizbay, Shebe and Tegirmech.

References
 

Nature reserves in Kyrgyzstan
Protected areas established in 2009